The third law of thermodynamics states, regarding the properties of closed systems in thermodynamic equilibrium:  This constant value cannot depend on any other parameters characterizing the closed system, such as pressure or applied magnetic field. At absolute zero (zero kelvins) the system must be in a state with the minimum possible energy. Entropy is related to the number of accessible microstates, and there is typically one unique state (called the ground state) with minimum energy. In such a case, the entropy at absolute zero will be exactly zero. If the system does not have a well-defined order (if its order is glassy, for example), then there may remain some finite entropy as the system is brought to very low temperatures, either because the system becomes locked into a configuration with non-minimal energy or because the minimum energy state is non-unique. The constant value is called the residual entropy of the system. The entropy is essentially a state-function meaning the inherent value of different atoms, molecules, and other configurations of particles including subatomic or atomic material is defined by entropy, which can be discovered near 0 K.

The Nernst–Simon statement of the third law of thermodynamics concerns thermodynamic processes at a fixed, low temperature:  Here a condensed system refers to liquids and solids.

A classical formulation by Nernst (actually a consequence of the Third Law) is: 

There also exists a formulation of the third law which approaches the subject by postulating a specific energy behavior:

History 

The third law was developed by chemist Walther Nernst during the years 1906–12, and is therefore often referred to as Nernst's theorem or Nernst's postulate. The third law of thermodynamics states that the entropy of a system at absolute zero is a well-defined constant. This is because a system at zero temperature exists in its ground state, so that its entropy is determined only by the degeneracy of the ground state.

In 1912 Nernst stated the law thus: "It is impossible for any procedure to lead to the isotherm  in a finite number of steps."

An alternative version of the third law of thermodynamics as stated by Gilbert N. Lewis and Merle Randall in 1923:
If the entropy of each element in some (perfect) crystalline state be taken as zero at the absolute zero of temperature, every substance has a finite positive entropy; but at the absolute zero of temperature the entropy may become zero, and does so become in the case of perfect crystalline substances.

This version states not only  will reach zero at 0 K, but  itself will also reach zero as long as the crystal has a ground state with only one configuration. Some crystals form defects which cause a residual entropy. This residual entropy disappears when the kinetic barriers to transitioning to one ground state are overcome.

With the development of statistical mechanics, the third law of thermodynamics (like the other laws) changed from a fundamental law (justified by experiments) to a derived law (derived from even more basic laws). The basic law from which it is primarily derived is the statistical-mechanics definition of entropy for a large system:

Explanation
In simple terms, the third law states that the entropy of a perfect crystal of a pure substance approaches zero as the temperature approaches zero. The alignment of a perfect crystal leaves no ambiguity as to the location and orientation of each part of the crystal. As the energy of the crystal is reduced, the vibrations of the individual atoms are reduced to nothing, and the crystal becomes the same everywhere.

The third law provides an absolute reference point for the determination of entropy at any other temperature. The entropy of a closed system, determined relative to this zero point, is then the absolute entropy of that system. Mathematically, the absolute entropy of any system at zero temperature is the natural log of the number of ground states times the Boltzmann constant .

The entropy of a perfect crystal lattice as defined by Nernst's theorem is zero provided that its ground state is unique, because . Hence:

The difference is zero, hence the initial entropy  can be any selected value so long as all other such calculations include that as the initial entropy. As a result, the initial entropy value of zero is selected  is used for convenience.

Example: Entropy change of a crystal lattice heated by an incoming photon

Initially, there is only one accessible microstate:

Let's assume the crystal lattice absorbs the incoming photon. There is a unique atom in the lattice that interacts and absorbs this photon. So after absorption, there is  possible microstates accessible by the system, each of the microstates corresponding to one excited atom, and the other atoms remaining at ground state.

The entropy, energy, and temperature of the closed system rises and can be calculated. The entropy change is:

From the second law of thermodynamics:

Hence:

Calculating entropy change:

The energy change of the system as a result of absorbing the single photon whose energy is :

The temperature of the closed system rises by:

A single atom was assumed to absorb the photon but the temperature and entropy change characterizes the entire system.

Systems with non-zero entropy at absolute zero

An example of a system which does not have a unique ground state is one whose net spin is a half-integer, for which time-reversal symmetry gives two degenerate ground states. For such systems, the entropy at zero temperature is at least  (which is negligible on a macroscopic scale). Some crystalline systems exhibit geometrical frustration, where the structure of the crystal lattice prevents the emergence of a unique ground state. Ground-state helium (unless under pressure) remains liquid.

In addition, glasses and solid solutions retain large entropy at 0 K, because they are large collections of nearly degenerate states, in which they become trapped out of equilibrium. Another example of a solid with many nearly-degenerate ground states, trapped out of equilibrium, is ice Ih, which has "proton disorder".

For the entropy at absolute zero to be zero, the magnetic moments of a perfectly ordered crystal must themselves be perfectly ordered; from an entropic perspective, this can be considered to be part of the definition of a "perfect crystal". Only ferromagnetic, antiferromagnetic, and diamagnetic materials can satisfy this condition. However, ferromagnetic materials do not, in fact, have zero entropy at zero temperature, because the spins of the unpaired electrons are all aligned and this gives a ground-state spin degeneracy. Materials that remain paramagnetic at 0 K, by contrast, may have many nearly-degenerate ground states (for example, in a spin glass), or may retain dynamic disorder (a quantum spin liquid).

Consequences

Absolute zero

The third law is equivalent to the statement that
It is impossible by any procedure, no matter how idealized, to reduce the temperature of any closed system to zero temperature in a finite number of finite operations.

The reason that  cannot be reached according to the third law is explained as follows: Suppose that the temperature of a substance can be reduced in an isentropic process by changing the parameter X from X2 to X1. One can think of a multistage nuclear demagnetization setup where a magnetic field is switched on and off in a controlled way. If there were an entropy difference at absolute zero,  could be reached in a finite number of steps. However, at T = 0 there is no entropy difference so an infinite number of steps would be needed. The process is illustrated in Fig. 1.

Specific heat
A non-quantitative description of his third law that Nernst gave at the very beginning was simply that the specific heat can always be made zero by cooling the material down far enough. A modern, quantitative analysis follows.

We have

So the heat capacity must go to zero at absolute zero

if it has the form of a power law. The same argument shows that it cannot be bounded below by a positive constant, even if we drop the power-law assumption.

But clearly a constant heat capacity does not satisfy Eq.. That is, a gas with a constant heat capacity all the way to absolute zero violates the third law of thermodynamics. We can verify this more fundamentally by substituting  in Eq., which yields

In the limit  this expression diverges, again contradicting the third law of thermodynamics.

The conflict is resolved as follows: At a certain temperature the quantum nature of matter starts to dominate the behavior. Fermi particles follow Fermi–Dirac statistics and Bose particles follow Bose–Einstein statistics. In both cases the heat capacity at low temperatures is no longer temperature independent, even for ideal gases. For Fermi gases

with the Fermi temperature TF given by

Here  is the Avogadro constant,  the molar volume, and  the molar mass.

For Bose gases

with TB given by

The specific heats given by Eq. and  both satisfy Eq.. Indeed, they are power laws with α=1 and α=3/2 respectively.

Even within a purely classical setting, the density of a classical ideal gas at fixed particle number becomes arbitrarily high as  goes to zero, so the interparticle spacing goes to zero. The assumption of non-interacting particles presumably breaks down when they are sufficiently close together, so the value of  gets modified away from its ideal constant value.

Vapor pressure
The only liquids near absolute zero are 3He and 4He. Their heat of evaporation has a limiting value given by

with L0 and Cp constant. If we consider a container, partly filled with liquid and partly gas, the entropy of the liquid–gas mixture is

Clearly the entropy change during the liquid–gas transition ( from 0 to 1) diverges in the limit of T→0. This violates Eq.(). Nature solves this paradox as follows: at temperatures below about 50 mK the vapor pressure is so low that the gas density is lower than the best vacuum in the universe. In other words: below 50 mK there is simply no gas above the liquid.

Latent heat of melting
The melting curves of 3He and 4He both extend down to absolute zero at finite pressure. At the melting pressure, liquid and solid are in equilibrium. As a result, the latent heat of melting is zero and the slope of the melting curve extrapolates to zero as a result of the Clausius–Clapeyron equation.

Thermal expansion coefficient
The thermal expansion coefficient is defined as

With the Maxwell relation

and Eq. with  it is shown that

So the thermal expansion coefficient of all materials must go to zero at zero kelvin.

See also
 Adiabatic process
 Ground state
 Laws of thermodynamics
 Quantum thermodynamics
Residual entropy
 Thermodynamic entropy
 Timeline of thermodynamics, statistical mechanics, and random processes
 Quantum heat engines and refrigerators

References

Further reading
Goldstein, Martin & Inge F. (1993) The Refrigerator and the Universe. Cambridge MA: Harvard University Press. . Chpt. 14 is a nontechnical discussion of the Third Law, one including the requisite elementary quantum mechanics.

3